Ali Bitchin Mosque or Zawj Euyun Mosque is a historic mosque in Algiers, Algeria. Ali Bitchin ordered the construction of the mosque in 1622. it is situated inside the UNESCO World Heritage Site Casbah of Algiers. It's located at the crosspoint between the Bab al-Wadi Street and the lower area of casbah.

History

Ali Bitchin was reportedly a man of non-Islamic origin whose name was Piccini or Puccini or Piccinino. Ali Bitchin led the Algerian Navy fleet during 1630-1646. In 1599 he converted to Islam through Fathullah Khoja who owned the vessels, and chose the name Ali Bitchin. He then ordered the construction of mosque in 1622, in the Ottoman architectural form. It was equipped with a minaret which was 15 meters high and resembled Maghrebi style.

On the early days, the mosque had an area size of 500 square meters and consisted of three floors, three rooms, ten shops, a bakery, a hamam, a mill and an inn. The inn was used by several high ranking politicians and religious leaders. Its hamam was especially popular and it remained active until two years after the French occupation begun. The mosque was located in the commercial area of the casbah, making many shops working around the mosque. In 1703, the mosque was briefly renamed to "Sidi al-Mahdi Mosque", reflecting the governor at the time.

During the French occupation, height of the minaret was reduced to 12 meters. The mosque was then converted to the military pharmacy center before turning into the church in 1843. After the conversion, some of the characters of the Islamic architectural style was lost. The French occupiers also knocked one of the doors of Ketchaoua Mosque and used it as a decoration of the newly converted church. The mosque was among the 21 other mosques in the casbah whose features had been modified or transformed, for example by eliminating the wudu place and altering the mihrab. It was consecrated back to the mosque after the independence, with the Christian cross removed from the minaret.

Architecture

The mosque was initially accommodatable up to 500 worshipers. After the renovation in 2010, it can now accommodate additional 300 worshipers.

Notable Imams
 Mohamed Charef (1908-2011)

See also
 Algerian Islamic reference
 Hizb Rateb (Hezzab, Bash Hezzab, Salka)
 Lists of mosques
 List of mosques in Africa
 List of mosques in Algeria

References

17th-century mosques
Casbah of Algiers
Mosques in Algiers
Ottoman Mosques in Algeria